William Martin Dickson, also known as William M. Dickson (1827-1889), was a lawyer, prosecuting attorney, and judge from Cincinnati, Ohio, United States. He was one of the founders of the Republican Party and assisted in the framing of the Emancipation Proclamation. Alphonso Taft, the father of President and Chief Justice William Howard Taft, and Thomas Marshall Key were his law partners.

He formed and led the Black Brigade of Cincinnati that built a blockade to prevent Confederate troops from attacking Cincinnati. A semi-invalid after the war, he wrote about political and social reform for the last 23 years of his life.

A relative by marriage, Dickson was a presidential elector supporting Lincoln during the 1860 election. His wife, Annie Maria Palmer was the first cousin of Mary Todd Lincoln.

Early life and education
Dickson was born on September 19, 1827 in Lexington, Scott County, Indiana to Richard L. Dickson and Rachel Lowry (1801–1860),  who married in Madison, Indiana on November 20, 1825 and settled in Scott County. Richard, a farmer, immigrated to the United States from Scotland. Rachel, born in Rockingham County, Virginia on March 22, 1801, descended from the early Campbell and Lowry families of Virginia. William's father died in 1835, when William was eight years old. Rachel moved her family to Hanover, Indiana, where there was a better school. William was described as having "weak" health as a child.

He had an older brother named John J. Dickson, who was born in 1826. John learned the copper trade so that William could go to school. John quit the copper trade and his mother Rachel moved to Iowa, settling in West Grove in 1850. He established a farm and wrote poetry, publishing the book A Farmer's Thoughts In Prose and Poetry.

William worked his way through college, first attending Hanover College. The college merged to Madison University, requiring William to walk to school in Madison. For two years, he stayed the weekends in Hanover and walked to school each Monday morning, carrying a week's worth of food and books. He then studied at Miami University in Oxford, Ohio, where he graduated the fifth of his class in 1846. He was nineteen years old. In Lexington, Kentucky, he learned the law through self-study, while earning an income as a teacher. In 1848, he was admitted to the bar in Kentucky. He then studied at the Harvard Law School for two years and received his LLB in 1850. Chief Justice Joel Parker, a professor at Harvard, brought him into his household and treated him like a member of the family while he studied at Harvard. Parker provided a letter of introduction for Nathaniel Wright in Cincinnati, since he decided to move to the area but did not know anyone in the city.

Career

After law school, Dickson moved to Cincinnati. Nathaniel Wright, a judge in Cincinnati, took Dickson into his home for two years.  He was a tutor for the Wright family, a reporter at the  Cincinnati Times, and a teacher of Greek at St. John's College. He won the election for prosecuting attorney of the police court in Cincinnati in 1853, and he was the first person to hold that position. He won the favor of the area Germans based on his handling of the Bedinia riots case. He sought to support slaves in fugitive slave cases. He formed a law firm in April 1854 with Thomas Marshall Key and Alphonso Taft, the father of resident and Chief Justice William Howard Taft. He then transferred his interest in the firm to another lawyer and established his own law firm about 1855. In 1859, he received an appointment of a Common Pleas Court judgeship by Governor Salmon P. Chase. In 1860, he was an Ohio presidential elector. Dickson was one of the founders of the Republican Party. He declined an offer to become an assistant judge advocate by General George B. McClellan in 1861.

He was an abolitionist, an advocate of the Fugitive Slave Law, and he fought for desegregation of the city's street cars. During the Civil War he organized and led the Black Brigade of Cincinnati as they built a blockade to prevent the Confederate Army from attacking Cincinnati. He received the order by Major-General Lew Wallace on September 4, 1862 to command the Black Brigade of Cincinnati to build fortifications near Newport and Covington, Kentucky. At the conclusion of their work, Brigade members presented a sword as an award to Dickson for his kindness and leadership after they had been brutally rounded-up, penned, and forced to do work that they had attempted to volunteer to do. The brigade had 1,000 members, 700 of which built fortifications and 300 that were assigned other tasks for the military and city. As the brigade's leader, Dickson had ensured that the men under his command received the same treatment as white soldiers. They were the first group of African-Americans that were employed for military purposes by the Union Army. In December 1862, Dickson met or communicated with Edwin Stanton, Salmon P. Chase and Abraham Lincoln to discuss his ideas for the Emancipation Proclamation, and is considered a contributor to the proclamation.

For many years, he was a trustee and president of the board of trustees of the Ohio Medical College.

Marriage
He met Anne Marie Parker in Lexington, Kentucky in 1850. She was the daughter of Dr. John Todd Parker and Jane Logan Allen and a first cousin of Mary Todd Lincoln. Dickson married Anne Marie Parker on October 18, or October, 19 1852. They lived at 171 Longworth Street in Cincinnati and had six children. Three of their daughters—Mary, Annie and Lillie—did not live past their third year. Three other children lived through adulthood: Parker, William Lowry, and Jennie. He traveled for entertainment and trying to improve his health, he sought out physicians in the United States and Europe. In 1891, the family traveled to Derry, Ireland to see the old Lowry house and also to Scotland, near Dumfries, to see Rev. Jacob Dickson's manse and church at Mouswald. His mother, Rachel, traveled with them.

In 1857, Abraham Lincoln was hired to try the McCormick Reaper patent case in the U.S. Circuit Court in Cincinnati, during that trial he stayed with Dickson and his wife. Edwin Stanton, who was on the legal team, decided to not have Lincoln speak at the trial, he considered Lincoln a "gangly country lawyer". Since he did not need to be at the trial, Dickson showed him the sites of the city.

Later years and death
[[File:Money Question by William M. Dickson.jpg|thumb|left|175px|Book cover for Some Aspects of the Money Question" by William M. Dickson, 1877]]
He had suffered from "nervous prostration" after the war, which had caused Dickson to leave politics and the law at age 39. He was a semi-invalid for 23 years, during which he "despaired at the corruption and machine politics which increasingly characterized his party during the Gilded Age of late nineteenth century America." He wrote about black suffrage, reconstruction, civil service reform, and other topics often under the initials W.M.D. Dickson wrote a memoir entitled Lincoln at Cincinnati''.

He died on October 15, 1889 at the hospital in Cincinnati due to his injuries from the Mount Auburn incline accident. Five other people died, too. He was buried in the family plot at the Spring Grove Cemetery in Cincinnati. His wife, Annie Maria Parker Dickson died March 6, 1885.

Legacy
 A statue at the Smale Riverfront Park depicts Dickson receiving a ceremonial sword from Marshall P. H. Jones, a member of the Black Brigade of Cincinnati.

Notes

References

External links
 
 Letters between Abraham Lincoln and William M. Dickson, Library of Congress

1827 births
1889 deaths
Lawyers from Cincinnati
American judges
19th-century American politicians
American political party founders
People from Scott County, Indiana
Harvard Law School alumni
Miami University alumni
Ohio Republicans
19th-century American judges
19th-century American lawyers